Thanx is the seventh studio album by Japanese singer and songwriter Rina Aiuchi. It was released on March 25, 2009, through Giza Studio.

Background
The album consists of three previous released singles, such as Kimi to no Deai ~good bye my days~ (君との出逢い ～good bye my days～), Friends/Sugao no mama (素顔のまま) and Ai no Kotoba (アイノコトバ).

A special website "Thanx 10th anniversary" was launched to promote album which includes self liner notes, message from Rina and preview tracks.

This album is released in three formats: regular CD version (GZCA-5182) and limited "A" CD+DVD version (GZCA-5180) and limited "B" CD+DVD version (GZCA-5181). In limited "A" version is included DVD is included medley clips from "Rina♥Matsuri 2008". In limited "B" version is included DVD with three music videoclips of singles which were included in this album.

Chart performance
The album reached No. 12 on the Oricon charts in its first week. It charted for six weeks and sold more than 20,000 copies.

Track listing

In media
Thanx - theme song for Nihon TV program NNN News Real Time (Real Sport)
Friend - ending theme for Nihon TV program Ongaku Senshi Music Fighter
Ai no Kotoba - ending theme for Nihon TV program The Sunday Next
Kimi to Deai ~good bye my days~ - ending theme for Nihon TV program Nihonshi Suspense Gekijou

References

2009 albums
Being Inc. albums
Japanese-language albums
Giza Studio albums